The 2013 Tri-Cities Fever season was the team's ninth season as a professional indoor football franchise and fourth in the Indoor Football League (IFL). One of nine teams competing in the IFL for the 2013 season, the Kennewick, Washington-based Tri-Cities Fever were members of the Intense Conference. Founded in 2005 as part of National Indoor Football League, the Tri-Cities Fever moved to the af2 in 2007 then jumped to the IFL before the 2010 season.

Under the leadership of owner/general manager Teri Carr and head coach Adam Shackleford, the team played their home games at the Toyota Center in Kennewick, Washington. Shackleford's staff includes assistant coach Cleveland Pratt and defensive line coach Kimo von Oelhoffen. The Fever Girls are the official dance team.

Schedule
Key:

Regular season
All start times are local time

Roster

Standings

References

External links
Tri-Cities Fever official website
Tri-Cities Fever official statistics
Tri-Cities Fever at Tri-City Herald

Tri-Cities Fever
Tri-Cities Fever seasons
Tri-Cities Fever